The city of Edinburgh is the capital of Scotland, United Kingdom. Edinburgh City may refer to:
 Edinburgh City F.C., a semi-professional football club
 Edinburgh City F.C. (1928), an amateur football club (dissolved 1955)
 City of Edinburgh Council, the local authority body

See also
Edinburgh (disambiguation)